Hawkswood School (formerly the School for Children) is a private, non-sectarian school, located in Eatontown, New Jersey.  The School provides educational services for students with various disabilities (such as autism) and support for their families.

Hawkswood School is owned by Hawkswood, Inc.  The School is fully accredited by the state of New Jersey and a member of the National Association of Private Special Education Centers.   Hawkswood School provides an array of programs from pre-kindergarten to life preparedness classes for students, ages 3 – 21.  Many nearby public school districts contract with Hawkswood School to provide educational services to students who might be underserved by the public school districts.

In December 2011, New Jersey Lt. Governor Kim Guadagno visited Hawkswood School, presenting the school as an example of high-quality education for students with educational disabilities.

References

External links
 School website
 Hawkswood School PTO

Schools for people on the autistic spectrum
Special schools in the United States
1976 establishments in New Jersey
Educational institutions established in 1976
Eatontown, New Jersey